Saunders Island may refer to:

Saunders Island (Greenland), northwestern Greenland, on the 70th meridian west
Saunders Island (Falkland Islands)
Saunders Island (South Sandwich Islands)

See also
Saunders Islands National Park, Queensland, Australia
Saunders Islet, Queensland, Australia
Saunders (disambiguation)